Shahril Sufian bin Hamdan (born 29 October 1985), often referred to as Pet, is a Malaysian politician who has served as the Economic Director at the Prime Minister's Department under Prime Minister Ismail Sabri Yaakob from October 2021 until November 2022. Apart from that, he was the Information Chief of UMNO and the Vice Youth Chief of the party.

Early life and education
He studied in SMK Taman Bukit Maluri and was a straight A student. He graduated with a bachelor's degree in Economics and Politics at the University of Manchester under a Bank Negara Malaysia’s scholarship in 2008 and completed his master’s degree in Race, Ethnicity and Postcolonial Studies from the London School of Economics and Political Science, upon receiving a full Chevening Scholarship from the British Foreign and Commonwealth Office.

Early career
Previously, he was a strategy and management consultant at McKinsey and Company for three years, a placement manager at Teach For Malaysia for a few months, and a policy officer to Khairy Jamaluddin for two years—Shahril’s first job immediately upon graduation. Shahril also worked at Destini Oil Services as the Chief Executive Officer of the company before venturing into politics.

Political career

Career in UMNO and BN
Shahril has held various positions in UMNO within the divisional, state, and national level. He was the Youth Chief of the Division of Kuala Langat, Youth EXCO of UMNO Malaysia during the previous 2013-2018 session, and currently the Vice Youth Chief of UMNO. In 2020, he succeeded Shamsul Anuar Nasarah as the Information Chief of the Party. Shahril was eventually suspended for 6 years from UMNO alongside other national party leaders such as Annuar Musa, Noh Omar and Khairy Jamaluddin.

Parliamentary candidacy
Shahril first contested in the 14th Malaysian general election, where he was fielded for the Kuala Langat federal constituency under the BN ticket, but eventually lost to a 3 cornered race with former Pakatan Harapan MP Xavier Jayakumar. Shahril was hinted again to contest for parliament in the 15th Malaysian general election, and he was fielded at Alor Gajah in Malacca but again fell short losing to former Chief Minister of Malacca, Adly Zahari by a slim majority of 890 votes.

Personal life
Shahril enjoys watching sports such as cricket and football. He is a loyal supporter of the football club Newcastle United F.C.

Election results

References

External links 
 Official website

1985 births
Living people
Malaysian people of Malay descent
Malaysian Muslims
Malaysian accountants
United Malays National Organisation politicians
21st-century Malaysian politicians